Viktor Tarmas (also Viktor Tomberg; 19 November 1891 Tori Parish, Pärnu County - ?) was an Estonian politician. He was a member of Estonian Constituent Assembly.

References

1891 births
Members of the Estonian Constituent Assembly
Year of death missing